Silvia Angúlo Rugeles (born September 14, 1983 in Bucaramanga) is a Colombian squash player. She won gold medals in the 2010 South American Games and 2010 Central American and Caribbean Games. She achieved her highest world ranking of 66 in March 2007.

Squash titles
Angúlo won gold in women's singles at the National Games of Colombia in 2004. She joined the Professional Squash Association in 2005. At the 2007 Pan American Games, she won a bronze medal as part of the Colombian women's squash team alongside María Isabel Restrepo and Catalina Pelaez. She won a gold meal for women's singles at the 2008 Pan American Squash Championships in Ecuador.

In 2010, she won a gold medal with Pelaez in women's doubles at the Central American and Caribbean Games.

In 2011, she won silver in women's doubles at the 2011 Pan American Games.

References

1983 births
Living people
Colombian female squash players
South American Games gold medalists for Colombia
Central American and Caribbean Games gold medalists for Colombia
South American Games medalists in squash
Pan American Games medalists in squash
Pan American Games silver medalists for Colombia
Pan American Games bronze medalists for Colombia
Squash players at the 2007 Pan American Games
Squash players at the 2011 Pan American Games
Competitors at the 2010 South American Games
Competitors at the 2010 Central American and Caribbean Games
Central American and Caribbean Games medalists in squash
Medalists at the 2011 Pan American Games
People from Bucaramanga
Sportspeople from Santander Department
20th-century Colombian women
21st-century Colombian women